WBUZ (102.9 MHz, "The Buzz") is a commercial FM radio station licensed to La Vergne, Tennessee, and serving the Nashville metropolitan area. WBUZ airs an active rock music format, with elements of alternative rock, calling itself "Nashville's Rock Station." Weekday mornings, it carries the syndicated comedy and hot talk program "The Free Beer and Hot Wings Show." WBUZ is owned by The Cromwell Group, along with sports radio-formatted WPRT-FM and oldies-formatted WQZQ. The radio studios and offices are on Murfreesboro Pike in Nashville.

WBUZ has an effective radiated power (ERP) of 100,000 watts. WBUZ broadcasts using HD technology. It carries the sports programming of co-owned WPRT-FM on its HD2 digital subchannel and Fox Sports Radio/Outkick programming on its HD3 subchannel, feeding an FM translator at 94.9 MHz.

History
On May 1, 1962, the station signed on the air in Shelbyville, Tennessee, a small city about 60 miles south of Nashville. The call sign was WTCV and it mostly simulcast co-owned WHAL (1400 AM, now WZNG). In 1980, it switched its call letters to WYCQ and it called itself "Q102" with a Top 40 format, but its signal did not cover Nashville. Management asked the Federal Communications Commission (FCC) to allow the transmitter to be moved north and to increase the power to 100,000 watts, so it could become part of the Nashville radio market.

With the boost in power and coverage, the station flipped to a hybrid Country/Southern Rock format known as "Rockin' Country 102.9". The station's mascot was an anthropomorphic cow playing an electric guitar, and the station eventually changed its name to "Moo 102" (WMMU) to match its mascot. The station then shifted toward a mainstream country format and became known as "PC103" and "Power Country 103", before settling on "Power Country 102.9" (WZPC).

On April 2, 1999, WZPC flipped to an Album Rock format as "The Buzz," essentially "trading" formats with WKDF, which had flipped from rock to country the day prior. The station was assigned the WBUZ call letters by the FCC on October 16, 2001.

The Free Beer and Hot Wings Show from Grand Rapids replaced The Bob & Tom Show from Indianapolis as WBUZ's syndicated morning show on November 22, 2006.

In September 2010, WBUZ was named the new flagship station for the NHL's Nashville Predators. After the 2010–11 NHL season, its new all-sports sister station WPRT-FM became the team's radio flagship.

On June 13, 2022, WBUZ-HD3 changed its branding from "ESPN 94-9" to "94-9 The Fan".

Translators

History of callsign
The callsign WBUZ was originally assigned to a station in Bradbury Heights, Maryland. It began broadcasting January 1, 1948.
WBUZ was the call sign of a former AM Top 40 station in Terre Haute, Indiana, from 1993 to 2000 (see WBOW (1230 AM)), and prior to that, an AM station in Fredonia, New York.

See also
List of Nashville media

References

External links
WBUZ official website

BUZ
Active rock radio stations in the United States